Waimajã (Waimaha), generically known as Bará or (Northern) Barasano, is a Tucanoan language of Colombia and Brazil. As of 1971, the population of speakers generally lived along the rivers of Colombia, namely, Colorado, Yapu, Inambu, Macucu, and Tiquie.

References

Languages of Colombia
Tucanoan languages
Languages of Brazil